David William Thomas was the Archdeacon of Cardigan from 1936 until 1944.

Williams was educated at St David's College, Lampeter, and Jesus College, Oxford; and ordained in 1896. After curacies in Stella and Swansea he held incumbencies in Clydach and Llangyfelach.
After a curacy at  Llanelly he was Assistant Missioner in the Diocese of St Davids from 1903 to 1908 ; a Minor Canon of St Davids Cathedral and Senior Diocesan Inspector of Schools in the Diocese of St David's from 1908 to 1912; Vicar of Llandybie from 1912 to 1928; Vicar of Lampeter from 1928 to 1946; and Vicar of Skenfrith from 1946 to 1948.

He died on 5 March 1951.

References

1951 deaths
Alumni of the University of Wales, Lampeter
Alumni of Jesus College, Oxford
Archdeacons of Cardigan
Year of birth missing